Ross Doneghan (born 8 October 1988) is a Scottish rugby union coach now with Harlequins and Ealing Trailfinders. He previously played for Glasgow Warriors, London Scottish, Ayr, Stewart's Melville and Border Bulldogs.

Rugby Union career

Amateur career

Doneghan started playing mini rugby in Linlithgow with the wee reds. He continued his rugby at Stewart's Melville College.

He was part of the Stewart's Melville team that won the Bell Lawrie Scottish Schools Cup of 2006.

From Stewart's Melville he moved to the Rugby Legends Academy in South Africa, run by former Scotland and South Africa international player John Allan.

While with Glasgow Warriors, he played with Ayr from 2011. During this time at Ayr he converted from a Flanker to a Hooker.

He played for Darlington Mowden Park from 2013–14, who at the time played in National League 2 North. That season the Darlington side won promotion to National League 1 for the 2014-15 season. Doneghan played at Hooker for the Darlington side.

Professional career

In South Africa, Doneghan played for the Border Bulldogs in season 2009-10. He switched between Lock and Flanker for the South African side.

He moved to England to play with the Rotherham Titans in the RFU Championship in the 2010-11 season.

He became part of Glasgow Warriors set-up as a back-up player in the 2011-12 season. He played one match for the Warriors in that season; turning out for the Glasgow club in a pre-season friendly against Newcastle Falcons. The Warriors won the match 17 - 7.

After a successful season with Darlington, Doneghan was signed by London Scottish for 2014-15. His brother Mike Doneghan was playing with Scottish at the time.

Coaching career

During his time with London Scottish Doneghan migrated to a coaching role. He remained a coach there until 2017.

Doneghan also began coaching with Serge Betsen Rugby for the 2015-16 season.

He became a Community rugby coach for Harlequins in 2015, and became their Schools co-ordinator in 2017.

In 2018, he also became Head of Community coaching for Ealing Trailfinders.

He was also the Head coach at Haringey Rhino Ladies, where they finished the 2019/2020 season undefeated and top of the league, moving up for the coming season. Ross coined the phrase on the team #teamtobeat.

He joined Richmond FC in 2021 as the women’s forwards coach.

References

1988 births
Living people
Ayr RFC players
Border Bulldogs players
Darlington RFC players
Glasgow Warriors players
London Scottish F.C. players
Rotherham Titans players
Rugby union players from Linlithgow
Scottish rugby union coaches
Scottish rugby union players
Stewart's Melville RFC players
Rugby union flankers
Rugby union hookers